János L. Wimpffen (born 1950s, Graz, Austria) is an American motorsport historian and writer of Austro-Hungarian origin who specialises in sportscar racing; he is best known for his 1999 debut book Time and Two Seats, which won multiple awards.

He is a personal historian of the car collection for Bruce McCaw of McCaw Cellular Communications.

He subsequently published a series of picture books to accompany Time and Two Seats, despite being by a different publisher. Wimpffen currently resides in Seattle.

Works
Time and Two Seats
Open Roads & Front Engines
Winged Sports Cars and Enduring Innovation
Spyders & Silhouettes
Monocoques & Ground Effects

References

External links 
 Speedhunter profile

1950s births
Living people
20th-century American journalists
American male journalists
American people of Hungarian descent
Austrian journalists
Motoring journalists
Historians of motorsport
Austrian emigrants to the United States
Physicians from Graz
Writers from Seattle